The Mask is  a 1921 American silent mystery film directed by Bertram Bracken and starring Jack Holt, Hedda Nova and Michael D. Moore.

Cast
 Jack Holt as Kenneth Traynor / Handsome Jack 
 Hedda Nova as Helen Traynor 
 Michael D. Moore as Mickey, their son 
 Fred Malatesta as Señor Enrico Keralio 
 Harry Lonsdale as Winthrop Parker 
 Byron Munson as Arthur Steele 
 Janice Wilson as Rae Madison 
 William Clifford as François

References

Bibliography
 Goble, Alan. The Complete Index to Literary Sources in Film. Walter de Gruyter, 1999.

External links
 

1921 films
1921 drama films
1920s English-language films
American silent feature films
Silent American drama films
Films directed by Bertram Bracken
American black-and-white films
1920s American films